Sumo II is the reissue of Australian band The Superjesus' debut studio album Sumo. The album was released in October 1998, 8 months after the original and features live tracks and video clips. The album peaked at number 34 on the ARIA Charts.

The live tracks were recorded at The Metro Theatre, Sydney on 19 & 20 March 1998.

Track listing

Charts

Personnel
Stuart Rudd –  bass
Paul Berryman –  drums
Jeff Tomei –  engineer
Chris Tennent –  guitar, composer (strings)
Stephen Marcussen –  mastered
Greg Archilla –  mixing
Matt Serletic –  producer, mixing, arranger, composer (strings)
Sarah McLeod –  vocals, guitar

Release history

References

1998 albums
The Superjesus albums
Reissue albums
Albums produced by Matt Serletic